Zhang Xiaoting (born 21 January 1989) is a Chinese female volleyball player. 

She competed at the 2012 FIVB Volleyball Women's Club World Championship, with her club Bohai Bank Tianjin.

References

External links 
 Highlights of Xiaoting Zhang's spikes, Middle Blocker, Volleyball - Wang Yoka, 2016

1989 births
Chinese women's volleyball players
Living people